Phorusrhacos is an extinct genus of giant flightless terror birds that inhabited Argentina during the Miocene epoch. Phorusrhacos was one of the dominant land predators in South America at the time it existed. It is thought to have lived in woodlands and grasslands.

Discovery and naming 

Remains are known from several localities in the Santa Cruz Formation and Monte León Formation in the Santa Cruz Province, of Argentina. Among the bones found in the strata of the Santa Cruz Formations (now considered as mainly of mid-Miocene date) was the piece of a mandible which Florentino Ameghino discovered in early 1887 and the same year at first described as that of an edentate mammal which he named Phorusrhacos longissimus. 

The generic name is derived from Greek -φόρος, (-phoros), an element meaning "bearer" in word combinations, and ῥάκος, (rhakos), "rag" or "wrinkle", probably in reference to the wrinkled jaw surface. When the original derivation was no longer understood, other translations were given, such as the literal translation of "Rag-Thief", and "branch-holder" from the mistaken assumption the name had been intended to be derived from a Greek rhakis, "branch". The specific name means "very long" in Latin, again in reference to the lower jaws. The holotype is the mandible, specimen MLP-118 (Museo de La Plata). In 1889 Ameghino emended the name to a more grammatically correct Phororhacos but the earlier name has priority. In 1891, it was by him recognized to be a bird.

Description 
It had very strong legs, capable of running at high speed, stubby, flightless wings, a long neck, and a proportionately large head. This ended in a huge, hooked beak that could tear through flesh easily, or stab into prey. The lower jaw was smaller than the upper jaw. There were three toes on each of the feet, all of which were armed with sharp claws.

Classification 

Phorusrhacos was part of the group called the Phorusrhacidae, which is an extinct group of flightless, cursorial carnivorous birds that occupied one of the dominant, large land-predator niches in South America from the lower Eocene to the Pleistocene. They dispersed into North America during the Great American Biotic Interchange (∼3 Ma). Some remains from Africa and Europe and the Paleocene of Brazil have been referred to this clade or identified as phylogenetically related to the extant South American seriemas, but these assignments remain controversial.

The following cladogram follows the analysis of Degrange and colleagues, 2015:

References 

Phorusrhacinae
Bird genera
Extinct flightless birds
Serravallian extinctions
Burdigalian first appearances
Miocene birds of South America
Laventan
Colloncuran
Friasian
Santacrucian
Colhuehuapian
Neogene Argentina
Fossils of Argentina
Fossil taxa described in 1887
Taxa named by Florentino Ameghino